Løsning is a town in Denmark. The town is located just north of (and directly adjacent to) the town of Hedensted. Together, they form an urban area with a population of 12,220 (1 January 2022).

Geographically, Løsning lies halfway between the larger towns of Horsens and Vejle, beside the European route E45. For administrative purposes, the town is in Hedensted Municipality, Central Denmark Region.

References

Cities and towns in the Central Denmark Region
Hedensted Municipality